Abraham Van Helsing is a character in Dracula media.

Van Helsing may also refer to:
Van Helsing (film), a 2004 action/horror film
Gabriel Van Helsing, a character in Van Helsing media
Van Helsing (video game), a video game based on the 2004 film
Van Helsing: The London Assignment, the animated film 
The Incredible Adventures of Van Helsing, a 2013 video game
Jan van Helsing or Jan Udo Holey (born 1967), controversial German author
Mr. Eric Van Helsing, a character in the Young Dracula universe
Ronnie Van Helsing, a character in Sword of Dracula media
Rachel van Helsing, a Marvel comic book character
 Van Helsing (TV series), a 2016 American television horror series

See also
Helsing
Hellsing, a Japanese manga series